This list consists of many notable people who are transgender. The individual listings note the subject's nationality and main occupation.

In some non-Western, ancient or medieval societies, transgender people may be seen as a different gender entirely, and there may be a separate category for them that is different from the binary of 'man' or 'woman'. These people might be described collectively as occupying a third gender role. These cultures may have traditional  social and ceremonial roles for third gender people, which are different from men's or women's roles and social spaces.

While cross-dressing is not synonymous with being transgender, some of the persons listed here crossdressed during wartime for various purposes.

List

See also

 List of people with non-binary gender identities
 List of intersex people
 List of people killed for being transgender
 List of transgender-related topics
 List of gay, lesbian or bisexual people
 List of transgender and transsexual fictional characters
 List of transgender characters in film and television
 List of transgender politicians

Notes

References